The 2011 North Devon District Council election took place on 5 May 2011 to elect members of North Devon District Council in Devon, England. The whole council was up for election and the Conservative party lost overall control of the council to no overall control.

Background
Before the election the council was controlled by the Conservatives with 22 councillors, compared to 17 Liberal Democrats and 4 independents. However North Devon was reported as one of the councils that the Conservatives were most likely to lose control of in 2011.

There were 120 candidates standing in the election for the 43 seats on the council. These were made up of 36 Conservatives, 33 Liberal Democrats, 20 independents, 17 Green Party, 10 Labour, 2 Trade Unionist and Socialist Coalition, 1 United Kingdom Independence Party and 1 Communist Party of Britain. The candidates included the former Liberal Democrat leader of the council, Malcolm Prowse, and Yvette Gubb, who both quit the Liberal Democrats to stand as independents in the election.

Election result
The results saw the Conservative lose their majority on the council, dropping to 18 seats after suffering a net loss of four councillors. The Liberal Democrats stayed as the main opposition with 14 seats, but also dropped 3 seats. It was independents who made progress in the election, with the number of independent councillors going up to 11. Overall turnout in the election was 45.33%, ranging from a high of 63% in Bratton Fleming to a low of 30% in Forches and Whiddon Valley.

Among the councillors to lose their seats to independents were Conservatives Dick Jones and John Gill in Fremington and Liberal Democrats Carol Mccormack-Hole and Sue Sewell in Bickington and Roundswell, and South Molton respectively. Successful independent candidates included the former Conservative Rodney Cann and the former Liberal Democrat Malcolm Prowse.

10 of the 11 elected independent councillors divided up into 3 groups, New Wave, containing Rodney Cann, Joanne Bell, Frank Biederman and Brian Hockin, North Devon First, containing Malcolm Prowse, Julia Clark and Yvette Gubb, and Independent Group, containing Mike Edmunds, Eric Ley and Walter White. The final independent, John Moore, was not part of any group.

Following the election a coalition between the Liberal Democrat and independent councillors took control of the council from the former Conservative administration. Liberal Democrat Brian Greenslade became the new council leader, taking over from Conservative Des Brailey, while independent Rodney Cann became deputy leader. The new cabinet was made up of 5 Liberal Democrats and 4 independents.

2 independent candidates were unopposed.

Ward results

Chris Haywood was a sitting councillor for Yeo Valley ward.

By-elections

References

2011 English local elections
2011
2010s in Devon